Austrosimulium ungulatum, known by the common name West Coast black fly or just sandfly, is a species of small fly of the family Simuliidae that is endemic to New Zealand. Females consume blood for nutrients to produce eggs and it is one of three species of Austrosimulium in New Zealand that often bite humans.

The bodies of adult females are 2.7–3.4 mm long; their wings are 2.8–3.2 mm long and 1.2–1.4 mm wide. The bodies of males are 2.7–3.4 mm long; their wings 2.8–3.2 mm long and 1.2–1.4 mm wide.

It is found in most regions of the South Island and on Stewart Island, prolifically in some regions and less so in others. It is almost absent from the east coast plains and Banks Peninsula, but has been found at Kaituna. Immature specimens have been found from sea level to 990 metres above sea level, and adults have been collected at up to 1,200 metres. Early stages of the insect are found in small, cold-water streams, usually under heavy forest shade that serves to keep the water cool.

References

External links 

 Austrosimulium ungulatum discussed on Radio New Zealand Critter of the Week, 15 February 2019

Simuliidae
Diptera of New Zealand
Endemic fauna of New Zealand
Insects described in 1925
Hematophages
Endemic insects of New Zealand